Nansa (also Romanized as Nānsā’) is a village in Khezerlu Rural District, in the Central District of Ajab Shir County, East Azerbaijan Province, Iran. At the 2006 census, its population was 899, in 234 families.

People 
Most of the people of this village are engaged in agriculture and animal husbandry.

References 

Populated places in Ajab Shir County